Klett may refer to:

People
 Arnulf Klett (1905–1974), mayor of Stuttgart, Germany
 August Klett (1799–1869), German politician
 August Klotz (1866–1928), also called August Klett, German artist 
 Theodor von Cramer-Klett (1817–1884), German industrialist

Places
 Klett (Norway), a village in Trondheim municipality in Trøndelag county, Norway